is a train station on the Osaka Metro Imazatosuji Line in Asahi-ku, Osaka, Japan. It is the least used subway station in the Osaka Metro network, with only 5,439 people using the station daily in 2016. However, it is not the least used station in the entire network, as several stations of the Nankō Port Town Line have lower ridership figures.

Layout
The station has an island platform fenced with platform gates between two tracks underground. Two siding tracks are located in the south of the station and connect to Tsurumi-ryokuchi-kita Depot and Tsurumi Inspection Depot.

References

Asahi-ku, Osaka
Osaka Metro stations
Railway stations in Japan opened in 2006